Oleh Kostromitin (born 16 June 1972) is a Ukrainian speed skater. He competed at the 1994 Winter Olympics and the 1998 Winter Olympics.

References

External links
 

1972 births
Living people
Ukrainian male speed skaters
Olympic speed skaters of Ukraine
Speed skaters at the 1994 Winter Olympics
Speed skaters at the 1998 Winter Olympics
Sportspeople from Sumy